The August is a country rock band formed in Chicago, Illinois in 2005 now based in Nashville, Tennessee. Members include Jacky Dustin, Wojtek Krupka, Tim Good and Cameron Clarke. Known for their live show that is reminiscent of 70s era country rock infused with the pop sensibilities of today.

Press 
Chicago Tribune:
 August turns dating maladies into some bittersweet melodies 
 The August is getting hotter 
The Nashville Bridge:
 The August with Jacky Dustin Sweet Emotion at Douglas 
Daily Herald:
 83rd Lake County Fair offers simpler time

History 
Patrick Blanchard, previous guitar player, currently is touring with Shawn Mullins.

Discography 
 Thistle, Sparrow, and the Tall, Tall Grass - 2005
 The Aware Compilation 11 - 2005
 The Uptown Session - 2009
 Dear Chicago, Love Nashville - 2011

References

External links 
 Official Website

American country rock groups